Plagiorchis elegans is a species of parasitic trematodes (flukes) in the genus Plagiorchis. Its host is Stagnicola elodes.

References 

 Plagiorchis elegans: emergence, longevity and infectivity of cercariae, and host behavioural modifications during cercarial emergence. CA Lowenberger, ME Rau, Parasitology, 1994
 Selective oviposition by Aedes aegypti (Diptera: Culicidae) in response to a larval parasite, Plagiorchis elegans (Trematoda: Plagiorchiidae). CA Lowenberger, ME Rau, Environmental Entomology, 1994, 

Plagiorchiidae
Animals described in 1802
Parasites of molluscs